The following is a list of lakes in Montenegro.

Lake Bileća (Bilećko jezero) - Only partly in Montenegro, with most of the lake in Bosnia and Herzegovina.
Lake Biograd (Biogradsko jezero)
Black Lake (Crno jezero) - Glacial lake near Žabljak on Durmitor.
Lake Grahovo (Grahovsko jezero)
Lake Hrid (Hridsko jezero) - at Prokletije National park
Lake Kapetan (Kapetanovo jezero) - Glacial lake, 20 km east of Nikšić.
Lake Krupac (Krupačko jezero) - Artificial lake near Nikšić.
Lake Liverovići (Jezero Liverovići) - Artificial lake near Nikšić.
Lake Manito (Manito jezero) - Glacial lake, 20 km east of Nikšić, near Lake Kapetan and smaller of two.
Lake Pešići (Pešića jezero), on Bjelasica
Lake Piva (Pivsko jezero) - Biggest artificial lake in Montenegro.
Lake Plav (Plavsko jezero) - Glacial lake, near Plav, between Prokletije and Visitor.
Lake Rikavac (Rikavačko jezero), on Žijovo mountain (Kuči)
Lake Rujište (Jezero Rujište) - in Biševo, Rožaje.
Lake Skadar (Skadarsko jezero/Liqeni i Shkodres) - 2/3 in Montenegro, rest of it in Albania.
Lake Slano (Slano jezero) - Artificial lake near Nikšić.
Lake Sušica (Sušičko jezero), on Durmitor mountain
Lake Šas (Šasko jezero/Liqeni i Shasit)
Lake Šiš (Šiško jezero), on Bjelasica mountain
Lake Trnovac (Trnovačko jezero)
Lake Visitor (Visitorsko jezero)
Lake Vrag (Vražje jezero) - Glacial lake near Žabljak.
Lake Zminica (Zminičko jezero) - Glacial lake near Žabljak.
Lake Zogaj (Zogajsko jezero/Liqeni i Zogajve) - Crastic lake near Ulcinj.

See also
 Geography of Montenegro

References

Montenegro
Lakes